Else Poulsson (24 March 1909 – 10 February 2002) was a Norwegian painter and textile artist.

Biography
Poulsson was born in Rjukan in Telemark, Norway.  She was the daughter of  Jens Jørgensen Poulsson and Vivi Lange, and was a sister of Colonel Jens-Anton Poulsson and a niece of architect Magnus Poulsson.

Poulsson was educated at Statens kvinnelige industriskole and at the Norwegian National Academy of Craft and Art Industry, alongside Enevold Thømt, in Oslo and undertook further studies in Sweden and Finland. From 1929 to 1954 she worked for Den Norske Husflidsforening. Among her designs are several decorations for Oslo City Hall, including a carpet design, St. Hallvard, which was woven by Else Halling. Poulsson also produced designs for the Headquarters of the United Nations in New York City. She died in Bærum during 2002.

References

External links
 Else Poulsson listing on the Cooper Hewitt website
  Else Poulsson Tradisjonalist Og Modernist Matslinder; 11 November 2016

1909 births
2002 deaths
20th-century Norwegian women artists
People from Rjukan
Oslo National Academy of the Arts alumni
Norwegian tapestry artists
Norwegian textile designers
Norwegian women painters
Women textile artists